Diplothelopsis is a genus of spiders in the family Nemesiidae. It was first described in 1905 by Tullgren. , it contains 2 species, both from Argentina.

References

Nemesiidae
Mygalomorphae genera
Spiders of Argentina